Daniel Bragg (born 3 August 1992 in Sydney, Australia) is an Australian footballer who plays as an attacking midfielder for Blacktown City FC.

Club career

Early career
He started his career playing for NSW Premier League side Blacktown City.

Gold Coast United
In 2011, he had signed with the Gold Coast United FC who play in the A-League. He made his senior professional debut for Gold Coast United FC during the 2011–12 A-League campaign in a round 20 fixture against Adelaide United

References

1992 births
Living people
Soccer players from Sydney
Association football midfielders
Gold Coast United FC players
Central Coast Mariners Academy players
A-League Men players
National Premier Leagues players
Australian soccer players